(1757–1822) was a Japanese samurai of the Edo period. A senior retainer of the Sendai domain, he was first known as Kagenaka (景仲) and Murayasu (村寿). Muratsune was the ninth Katakura Kojūrō. He was appointed as bugyō (the Sendai equivalent of a Karō elder) in 1797. His childhood name was Shigegoro (繁五郎). On October 27, 1815, he fell ill, and resigned his position as bugyō in favor of his son Kagesada. Retired in 1817.

Family
 Father: Katakura Murakiyo
 Mother: a Concubine
 Children:
 Katakura Kagesada
 daughter married Date Munemitsu and Date Narikuni’s mother

Notes

External links
Katakura family tree (in Japanese)
Katakura-related timeline (in Japanese)

Samurai
1757 births
1822 deaths
Karō
Katakura clan